Euprosthenops is a genus of nursery web spiders that was first described by Reginald Innes Pocock in 1897.

Species
 it contains ten species and one subspecies, found only in Africa, India and Israel:
Euprosthenops australis Simon, 1898 – Senegal, Nigeria, Zambia, Botswana, South Africa
Euprosthenops bayaonianus (Brito Capello, 1867) (type) – West, Central, East Africa
Euprosthenops benoiti Blandin, 1976 – Rwanda
Euprosthenops biguttatus Roewer, 1955 – Congo, Namibia
Euprosthenops ellioti (O. Pickard-Cambridge, 1877) – India
Euprosthenops insperatus Zonstein & Marusik, 2021 – Israel
Euprosthenops pavesii Lessert, 1928 – Central, East Africa
Euprosthenops proximus Lessert, 1916 – Central, East, Southern Africa
Euprosthenops p. maximus Blandin, 1976 – Ivory Coast
Euprosthenops schenkeli (Roewer, 1955) – East Africa
Euprosthenops wuehlischi Roewer, 1955 – Namibia

See also
 List of Pisauridae species

References

Araneomorphae genera
Pisauridae
Spiders of Africa
Spiders of the Indian subcontinent
Taxa named by R. I. Pocock